Giovinazzo is an Italian surname. Notable people with the surname include:

Buddy Giovinazzo (born 1957), American film director
Carmine Giovinazzo (born 1973), American actor
Girolamo Giovinazzo (born 1968), Italian judoka
Isabella Giovinazzo, Australian actress

Italian-language surnames